Disruptive mood dysregulation disorder (DMDD) is a mental disorder in children and adolescents characterized by a persistently irritable or angry mood and frequent temper outbursts that are disproportionate to the situation and significantly more severe than the typical reaction of same-aged peers. DMDD was added to the DSM-5 as a type of depressive disorder diagnosis for youths. The symptoms of DMDD resemble those of attention deficit hyperactivity disorder (ADHD), oppositional defiant disorder (ODD), anxiety disorders, and childhood bipolar disorder  .

DMDD first appeared as a disorder in the Diagnostic and Statistical Manual of Mental Disorders, Fifth Edition (DSM-5) in 2013 and is classified as a mood disorder. Treatments include medication to manage mood symptoms as well as individual and family therapy to address emotion-regulation skills. Children with DMDD are at risk for developing depression and anxiety later in life.

Signs and symptoms 
Children with DMDD show severe and recurrent temper outbursts three or more times per week. These outbursts can be verbal or behavioral. Verbal outbursts often are described by observers as "rages", "fits", or "tantrums". Children may scream, yell, and cry for excessively long periods of time, sometimes with little provocation. Physical outbursts may be directed toward people or property. Children may throw objects; hit, slap, or bite others; destroy toys or furniture; or otherwise act in a harmful or destructive manner.

Children with DMDD also display persistently irritable or angry mood that is observable by others. Parents, teachers, and classmates describe these children as habitually angry, touchy, grouchy, or easily "set off". Unlike the irritability that can be a symptom of other childhood disorders, such as ODD, anxiety disorders, and major depressive disorder, the irritability displayed by children with DMDD is not episodic or situation-dependent. In DMDD, the irritability or anger is severe and is shown most of the day, nearly every day in multiple settings, lasting for one or more years.

Note 
DMDD is a newly classified disorder, first appearing in the Diagnostic and Statistical Manual of Mental Disorders (DSM-5) in 2013. The DSM is used for the assessment and diagnosis of mental disorders; it does not include specific guidelines for the treatment of any disorder.

Researchers at the National Institute of Mental Health (NIMH) developed the DMDD diagnosis to diagnose more accurately youth who may have been previously diagnosed with pediatric bipolar disorder (despite not experiencing the symptoms needed for a diagnosis of bipolar disorder).

By 2018, the rate of clinical diagnosis for DMDD became more prevalent than the rate of diagnosis for bipolar disorder in children age 10–17 years old.  From 2013-2018, the rate of bipolar diagnosis in this age range decreased significantly, indicating that many children who would have been diagnosed with bipolar disorder prior to 2013 are now being diagnosed with DMDD.

The DSM-5 includes several additional diagnostic criteria which describe the duration, setting, and onset of the disorder: the outbursts must be present for at least 12 months and occur in at least two settings (e.g. home and school), and it must be severe in at least one setting. Symptoms appear before the age of 10, and diagnosis must be made between ages 6 and 18.

Comorbidity 
The core features of DMDD—temper outbursts and chronic irritability—are sometimes seen in children and adolescents with other psychiatric conditions. Differentiating DMDD from these other conditions can be difficult. Three disorders that most closely resemble DMDD are attention deficit hyperactivity disorder (ADHD), oppositional defiant disorder (ODD), and bipolar disorder in children.

ADHD 
Attention deficit hyperactivity disorder (ADHD) is a neurodevelopmental disorder characterized by problems with inattention and/or hyperactivity-impulsivity. ADHD is characterized by inattention, hyperactivity, and impulsivity that are pervasive, impairing in multiple contexts, and age-inappropriate. ADHD also associated with impaired executive functioning, structural and functional abnormalities in brain parts, such as frontal-striatal, with specific gene mutation.

ODD
ODD is a disruptive behavior disorder characterized by oppositional, defiant, and sometimes hostile actions directed towards others. The DSM-5 considers DMDD a severe manifestation of symptoms associated with ODD. A diagnosis of both DMDD and ODD is not permitted or necessary; individuals who meet the diagnostic requirements for DMDD also meet the requirements for ODD.

Bipolar disorder
One of the main differences between DMDD and bipolar disorder is that the irritability and anger outbursts associated with DMDD are not episodic; symptoms of DMDD are chronic and displayed constantly on an almost daily basis. On the other hand, bipolar disorder is characterized by distinct manic or hypomanic episodes usually lasting a few days, or a few weeks at most, that parents should be able to differentiate from their child's typical mood and behavior in between episodes. The DSM precludes a dual diagnosis of DMDD and bipolar disorder. Bipolar disorder alone should be used for youths who show classic symptoms of episodic mania or hypomania.

Prior to adolescence, DMDD is much more common than bipolar disorder. Most children with DMDD see a decrease in symptoms as they enter adulthood, whereas individuals with bipolar disorder typically display symptoms for the first time as teenagers and young adults. Children with DMDD are more at risk for developing major depressive disorder or generalized anxiety disorder when they're older rather than bipolar disorder.

Conduct Disorder 
Conduct disorder is a behavior disorder characterized by repeated, persistent patterns of behavior that violate the rights of others and disregard major societal norms and rules. While both DMDD and conduct disorder are associated with argumentative and defiant behavior, DMDD is distinctly differentiated from conduct disorder by the DSM. Individuals with DMDD experience severe emotional dysregulation not seen in conduct disorder. Additionally, conduct disorder is described by a distinct lack of remorse and repeated physical harm and threats of harm to people and/or animals. Evidence of conduct disorder during childhood is one of the criteria for an adult diagnosis of antisocial personality disorder, however adults with a continued diagnosis of conduct disorder do not necessarily have antisocial personality disorder.

Causes 

Youth with DMDD have difficulty attending, processing, and responding to negative emotional stimuli and social experiences in their everyday lives.  For example, some studies have shown youths with DMDD to have problems interpreting the social cues and emotional expressions of others. These youths may be especially bad at judging others' negative emotional displays, such as feelings of sadness, fearfulness, and anger. Functional MRI studies suggest that under-activity of the amygdala, the brain area that plays a role in the interpretation and expression of emotions and novel stimuli, is associated with these deficits. Deficits in interpreting social cues may predispose children to instances of anger and aggression in social settings with little provocation. For examples, youths with DMDD may selectively attend to negative social cues (e.g., others scowling, teasing) and minimize all other information about the social events. They may also misinterpret the emotional displays of others, believing others' benign actions to be hostile or threatening. Consequently, they may be more likely than their peers to act in impulsive and angry ways.

Children with DMDD may also have difficulty regulating negative emotions once they are elicited. To study these problems with emotion regulation, researchers asked children with DMDD to play computer games that are rigged so that children will lose. While playing these games, children with DMDD report more agitation and negative emotional arousal than their typically developing peers. Furthermore, youths with DMDD showed markedly greater activity in the medial frontal gyrus and anterior cingulate cortex compared to other youths. These brain regions are important because they are involved in evaluating and processing negative emotions, monitoring one's own emotional state, and selecting an effective response when upset, angry, or frustrated. Altogether, these findings suggest that youths with DMDD are more strongly influenced by negative events than other youths. They may become more upset and select less effective and socially acceptable ways to deal with negative emotions when they arise.

Treatment

Medication 
The creation of DMDD as a specific diagnosis in the DSM-5 was intended, in large part, to prevent the misdiagnosis of bipolar disorder in children, with hopes of avoiding medication mismanagement in younger mental health patients.  Interestingly, recent studies indicate that children diagnosed with DMDD are 12.5% more likely to be prescribed any psychoactive medication, and 7.9% more likely to be prescribed an antipsychotic medication than children diagnosed with bipolar disorder.

Due to the relatively recent inception of DMDD as a specific diagnosis, pharmacological treatments are often selected based on their historical efficacy reducing aggression and irritability in children with other mental disorders, such as conduct disorder, generalized anxiety disorder, major depression and bipolar disorder.

Recent trends have shifted toward prescription of antidepressants, specifically selective serotonin reuptake inhibitors (SSRIs), and psychostimulants (such as methylphenidate) for patients with DMDD.  Of note, these medications are theoretically better suited for patients with DMDD than those diagnosed with bipolar disorder, as antidepressants and stimulants may risk triggering more labile moods or manic episodes in patients with bipolar disorder.  Stimulant and antidepressant medications are prescribed both for their treatment of DMDD symptoms and in cases of comorbid ADHD and depressive disorders.

Antipsychotic medications are another primary intervention for children with DMDD, prescribed in as much as 58.9% of DMDD patients age 10-17.

Lithium and anticonvulsant medications, often implicated in the treatment of bipolar disorder, show moderate reduction of aggression in hospitalized children with conduct disorder, and are often prescribed to children with DMDD based on this history. However some research has found that lithium has not been shown to outperform a placebo in alleviating the signs and symptoms of DMDD.

Psychosocial 
Several cognitive-behavioral interventions have been developed to help youths with chronic irritability and temper outbursts. Because many youths with DMDD show problems with ADHD and oppositional-defiant behavior, experts initially tried to treat these children using contingency management. This type of intervention involves teaching parents to reinforce children's appropriate behavior and extinguish (usually through systematic ignoring or time out) inappropriate behavior. Although contingency management can be helpful for ADHD and ODD symptoms, it does not seem to reduce the most salient features of DMDD, namely, irritability and anger.

Epidemiology 
There are not good estimates of the prevalence of DMDD, but primary studies have found a rate of 0.8 to 3.3%. Epidemiological studies show that approximately 3.2% of children in the community have chronic problems with irritability and temper, the essential features of DMDD. These problems are probably more common among clinic-referred youths. Parents report that approximately 30% of children hospitalized for psychiatric problems meet diagnostic criteria for DMDD; 15% meet criteria based on the observations of hospital staff.

What is the difference between typical irritability and severe irritability? 
All children can become irritable sometimes. It’s a normal reaction to frustration. Children experiencing severe irritability (as observed in DMDD) have difficulty tolerating frustration and have outbursts that are out of proportion for the situation at hand. These outbursts occur more often and are more severe than what you would typically expect for children of this age.

For example, a parent tells the child to stop playing a game and do their homework. Any child might be frustrated or annoyed. But a child with DMDD may become extremely upset and emotional and have an intense temper outburst with yelling or hitting. A child with DMDD experiences these intense temper outbursts a few times a week.

History 

Beginning in the 1990s, some clinicians began observing children with hyperactivity, irritability, and severe temper outbursts. These symptoms greatly interfered with their lives at home, school, and with friends. Because other diagnoses, like ADHD and ODD, did not capture the severity of children's irritability and anger, many of these children were diagnosed with bipolar disorder.  Longitudinal studies showed that children with chronic irritability and temper outbursts often developed later problems with anxiety and depression, and rarely developed bipolar disorder in adolescence or adulthood. Consequently, the developers of DSM-5 created a new diagnostic label, DMDD, to describe children with persistent irritability and angry outbursts. In 2013, the American Psychiatric Association (APA) added DMDD to the DSM-5 and classified it as a depressive disorder.

References 

Mental disorders diagnosed in childhood